Ramsar is a sub - division in Barmer district in Indian state of Rajasthan. It is a tehsil headquarters with the same name. Ramsar has 25 Gram-Panchayats having  183 total number of villages. Sub divisional executive is headed by SDM and assistant collector.

Demographics

Population of Ramsar according to the Indian census 2001 is 3,888. Where male population is 2,070 and female population is 1,818.

References

Villages in Barmer district